The men's 100 metres (T47) at the 2022 Commonwealth Games, as part of the athletics programme, took place in the Alexander Stadium on 2 August 2022.

Records
Prior to this competition, the existing world and Games records were as follows:

Schedule
The schedule was as follows:

All times are British Summer Time (UTC+1)

Results

First round
First 3 in each heat (Q) and the next 2 fastest (q) advance to the Final

Wind: Heat 1: -0.6 m/s, Heat 2: -0.9 m/s

Final
The medals were determined in the final.

Wind: +0.5m/s

References

Men's 100 metres (T47)